Axonopus compressus (syn. Axonopus compressus (Sw.) P.Beauv. var. australis G.A.Black, Milium compressum Sw., Paspalum compressum (Sw.) Nees, Paspalum platycaule Willd. ex Steud., Paspalum platycaulon Poir.) is a species of grass. It is often used as a permanent pasture, groundcover, and turf in moist, low fertility soils, particularly in shaded situations.  It is generally too low-growing to be useful in cut-and-carry systems or for fodder conservation.

While not optimal, it is occasionally used for football fields especially those which are not for elite competitions or where only a low level of maintenance can be done.

Common names
 English: broadleaf carpetgrass, carpet-grass, American carpet grass,  tropical carpet grass, blanket grass, lawn grass, Louisiana grass, savanna grass, Kearsney grass, 
 Fijian: kambutu ni vavalangi
 French: buffalo américain
 Spanish: "Grama Brasilera (Arg.)", alfombra, grama bahiana, grama trenza, zacate amargo, zacate dulce
 Portuguese: grama-são-carlos, grama curitibana, grama-sempre-verde, grama tapete, capim-bananal, pasto
 Malay: rumput parit, lit. "ditch grass" (common species found natively in South East Asia)

References

External links
Animal Feed Resources Information System: Axonopus compressus 
Tropical Forages: Axonopus compressus
USDA Plants Profile: Axonopus compressus

Flora of South America
Grasses of Alabama
Forages
Panicoideae
Flora of Nepal
Grasses of the United States
Lawn grasses